The Stoker is a 1935 British comedy film directed by Leslie Pearce and starring Leslie Fuller, Georgie Harris and Phyllis Clare.

Cast
 Leslie Fuller - Bill
 Georgie Harris - Oswald
 Phyllis Clare - Nita
 Leslie Bradley - Frank Munro
 Robert English - Sir Richard Munro
 Olive Melville - Alice
 Patrick Aherne - Russell Gilham
 Gibson Gowland - Steve

References

External links

1935 films
1935 comedy films
British comedy films
British black-and-white films
Films shot at Rock Studios
Films directed by Leslie Pearce
1930s English-language films
1930s British films